The Democratic People's Republic of Korea national basketball team (recognized as DPR Korea by FIBA and known colloquially and in the media as North Korea) represents the Democratic People's Republic of Korea in international basketball and is controlled by the Amateur Basketball Association of DPR of Korea, the governing body for basketball in North Korea.

In December 2013, former American basketball professional Dennis Rodman visited North Korea to help train the national team after he developed a friendship with Supreme Leader Kim Jong-un during his first visit to the country in February 2013. Rodman's visit and a match between the North Korean team and former NBA stars was depicted in the 2015 documentary film Dennis Rodman's Big Bang in Pyongyang. Kim Jong Un is said to be a fan of the Chicago Bulls.

Roster
The following is the North Korea roster in the men's basketball tournament of the 2010 Asian Games.

Tournament records

FIBA Asia Cup

<div style="text-align:left">

Asian Games

See also

Basketball in North Korea
Ri Myung-hun
North Korea national under-17 basketball team
North Korea women's national basketball team

References

External links
North Korea at the FIBA website.
Archived records of North Korea team participations

1947 establishments in North Korea
Basketball teams established in 1947
Basketball teams in North Korea
Men's national basketball teams
National sports teams of North Korea